Roger Johnson may refer to:

Roger Johnson (by 1530–64 or later) (died ?), member of Parliament
Roger Johnson (California official) (1934–2005), American businessman
Roger Johnson (politician), American politician
Roger Johnson (hurdler) (born 1943), New Zealand hurdler
Roger Johnson (footballer) (born 1983), English football player
Roger Johnson (TV presenter), English journalist and presenter
Roger Johnson, President of the British Computer Society
Roger Kirk Johnson (1922–1991), architect, artist and educator

See also
Roger Johnston (born 1930), Australian politician